Robert Walker (10 January 1879 – 28 August 1930) was a Scottish professional footballer, who played for Heart of Midlothian and Scotland.

Club career

Walker joined Hearts from Dalry Primrose  in 1896, making his debut in a "trial" match vs Sunderland. He played in a few games that clinched Hearts' second League Championship in 1897. Walker was the first Hearts player to score over 100 league goals, and he scored their 1000th SFL goal. Other notable achievements are his 33 goals against Hibernian, which is the record tally in the Edinburgh Derby if local competitions are included. He scored two hat-tricks against Hearts' main rivals, the first at the age of 19 years and 9 months in a 5–1 victory at Easter Road on 28 October 1898. He repeated the feat on 18 September 1905, again at Easter Road, in a 3–0 win.

The 1901 Scottish Cup was remembered as "Walker's Final", Hearts beating Celtic 4–3. With the score poised at 3–3 The Scotsman reported: "the Edinburgh team soon showed that they were not going to relinquish the grasp of the cup which their play entitled them to, and Walker once more proved himself the grandest forward on the field. Taking the ball some thirty yards right through the opposition, he shot straight and true. M'Arthur saved, but sent the "leather" to Bell, who tipped it over to Houston. By the last named it was again sent towards the Celtic custodian who muddled his attempt to avert, and again the Hearts were one to the good." After this match Charlie Thomson dubbed him "The Best Player in Europe" and his style of football, involving brilliant footwork and sublime passing was known as "Walkerism". He also played in Hearts Scottish Cup win of 1906.

During Hearts' first overseas tour to Norway in May 1912, King Haakon of Norway attended one of the games to specifically see Walker play.

Walker became a Hearts director in 1920. He died at the age of 51 in August 1930. Huge crowds lined the funeral route and thousands stood round his graveside. His obituary in The Scotsman stated "The Hearts never had a more brilliant forward than Walker. With the ball at his feet he could turn on his course elusively, and in such little space, that he could often put a whole defence out of position with his deft movement."

The Football Encyclopaedia from 1934, edited by Frank Johnston, referred to him simply as "Bobby Walker, the greatest natural footballer who ever played."

International career
He was the most capped Scottish footballer for Heart of Midlothian with 29 caps until the record was broken in 2006 by Steven Pressley. He held the Scotland national team caps record at various points from 1905 to 1931.

If caps are "weighted" to measure the number of games that were possible to play in a season, he is third in the all time Scottish caps list. His Scotland career of 13 Years, 1 Month and 3 days places him no 11 in the all-time list. He shares the record of 11 Scottish caps versus England, along with Alan Morton of Queens Park and Rangers. The record would have been 12 as he played in the Ibrox disaster match of 5 April 1902 which has subsequently been declared unofficial. In addition he won 14 Scottish League XI caps, which places him 7th in the all-time list.

International goals
Scores and results list Scotland's goal tally first.

Personal life
His brother Alex Walker also played for Hearts.

He was the uncle of St Mirren and Scotland defender George Walker, whose sisters also married footballers.

Bobby Walker is buried in North Merchiston Cemetery in Edinburgh.

See also
 List of one-club men in association football

References

External links
Profile at londonhearts.com
Scotland Record at londonhearts.com
"The Greatest Ever – Bobby Walker at Dalry Primrose"

1879 births
1930 deaths
Footballers from Edinburgh
Scottish footballers
Scotland international footballers
Heart of Midlothian F.C. players
Heart of Midlothian F.C. non-playing staff
Scottish Football League players
Scottish Football League representative players
Scottish Football Hall of Fame inductees
Association football forwards
Scottish Junior Football Association players
Scotland junior international footballers